Elmer Henry Zacher (September 17, 1880 – December 20, 1944) was a professional baseball outfielder. Nicknamed "Silver", he played one season in Major League Baseball in 1910, appearing in one game for the New York Giants and 47 games for the St. Louis Cardinals.

External links

Major League Baseball outfielders
New York Giants (NL) players
St. Louis Cardinals players
Pottstown (minor league baseball) players
Concord Marines players
Woodstock Maroons players
Worcester Busters players
Newark Sailors players
New Haven Blues players
New Haven Black Crows players
Oakland Oaks (baseball) players
Chattanooga Lookouts players
Salt Lake City Bees players
Elmira Colonels players
Newark Indians players
Rochester Hustlers players
Baseball players from New York (state)
1880 births
1944 deaths